The 1962 Detroit Titans football team represented the University of Detroit as an independent during the 1962 NCAA University Division football season. In their first year under head coach John Idzik, the Titans compiled a 1–8 record and were outscored by a combined total of 199 to 90.

The team's statistical leaders included Jerry Gross with 1,317 passing yards and 24 points scored, Vic Battani with 359 rushing yards, and Tom Bolz with 455 receiving yards.

Schedule

See also
 1962 in Michigan

References

External links
 1962 University of Detroit football programs

Detroit
Detroit Titans football seasons
Detroit Titans football
Detroit Titans football